Gavriel Gilad "Gabi" Kanichowsky (born ) is an Israeli professional footballer who plays as a midfielder for Maccabi Tel Aviv.

Early and personal life
Kanichowsky was born and raised in Ra'anana, Israel, to a religious Jewish family of Ashkenazi Jewish descent. He attended a yeshiva, and observes the Shabbat.

He married his Israeli fiancée Dana ( Hunter) in 2019.

Career
Kanichowsky made his professional debut for Hapoel Petah Tikva in the Israeli Premier League on 22 August 2016, starting in the match against Maccabi Netanya, which finished as a 0–0 home draw. In 2018, Hapoel Acre, who Kanichowsky was on loan with, exercised their option to sign him permanently from Maccabi Tel Aviv. He then joined Maccabi Netanya for the 2018–19 season.

International career
He has been a youth international since 2015. Between 2017–2018, he was part of Israel under-21s.

He was called up for the senior Israel national team in November 2021, during their 2022 FIFA World Cup qualifiers - UEFA. He debuted for the Israel national team in a friendly 2–0 loss to Germany on 26 March 2022.

See also
List of Jews in sports
List of Jewish footballers

References

External links
 
 
 
 

1997 births
Living people
Israeli footballers
Israel international footballers
Israel youth international footballers
Israel under-21 international footballers
Maccabi Tel Aviv F.C. players
Hapoel Petah Tikva F.C. players
Hapoel Acre F.C. players
Maccabi Netanya F.C. players
Israeli Premier League players
Liga Leumit players
Footballers from Ra'anana
Association football midfielders
Israeli Ashkenazi Jews